Straight Is the Way is a surviving 1921 American silent comedy film directed by Robert G. Vignola, written by Frances Marion and Ethel Watts Mumford, and starring Matt Moore, Mabel Bert, Gladys Leslie, George Parsons, Henry Sedley, Van Dyke Brooke, and Emily Fitzroy. It was released on March 6, 1921, by Paramount Pictures.

Plot
An old woman and her niece, an orphan, consult an ouija board to locate a hidden treasure in order to save their mortgaged home.

Cast 
Matt Moore as 'Cat' Carter
Mabel Bert as Aunt Mehitabel
Gladys Leslie as Dorcas
George Parsons as 'Loot' Follett
Henry Sedley as Jonathan Squoggs
Van Dyke Brooke as	Const. Whipple
Emily Fitzroy as Mrs. Crabtree
Peggy Parr as Bobby

Preservation status
A copy of Straight Is the Way survives in the Library of Congress collection. Edward Lorusso produced a DVD of the film in 2021 with a music score by David Drazin.

References

External links 

 
 

1921 films
1920s English-language films
Silent American comedy films
1921 comedy films
Paramount Pictures films
Films directed by Robert G. Vignola
American black-and-white films
American silent feature films
Films with screenplays by Frances Marion
1920s American films